This article contains information about the literary events and publications of 1511.

Events
probable – Ein kurtzweilig Lesen von Dyl Ulenspiegel, geboren uß dem Land zu Brunßwick, wie er sein Leben volbracht hat... is published by the printer Hans Grüninger in Strasbourg in Early New High German, either this year or in 1510. This is the first appearance of the trickster Till Eulenspiegel in print.

New books

Prose
The Demaũdes Joyous (joke book published by Wynkyn de Worde in English)
Desiderius Erasmus – The Praise of Folly (Stultitiae Laus), written 1509

Poetry

Jean Lemaire de Belges – La Concorde des deux langages
John Lydgate (died c. 1451) – The Governance of Kings ("Secrets of the Old Philisoffres", translated from Aristotle's Secreta secretorum)
Cancionero general (anthology of Spanish poetry published by Hernando del Castillo)

Births
November 15 – Johannes Secundus, Dutch poet writing in Latin (died 1536)

Deaths
unknown dates
Matthias Ringmann, German cartographer and humanist poet (born 1482)
Johannes Tinctoris (Jean de Vaerwere), Low Countries' composer, poet and writer on music, author of Diffinitorium musices, the first dictionary of musical terms (born c. 1435)

References

1511

1511 books
Years of the 16th century in literature